

Portugal
 Angola – Vasco Guedes de Carvalho e Meneses, Governor-General of Angola (1878–1880)

United Kingdom
 Jamaica – Sir Anthony Musgrave, Governor of Jamaica (1877–1883)
 Malta Colony – Arthur Borton, Governor of Malta (1878–1884)
 New South Wales 
 Hercules Robinson, Lord Rosmead, Governor of New South Wales (1872–1879)
 Lord Augustus Loftus, Governor of New South Wales (1879–1885)
 Queensland – Sir Arthur Kennedy, Governor of Queensland (1877–1883)
 Tasmania – Major Frederick Weld, Governor of Tasmania (1875–1880)
 South Australia – Lieutenant-General William Jervois, Governor of South Australia (1877–1883)
 Victoria 
 George Bowen, Governor of Victoria (1873–1879)
 George Phipps, Lord Normanby, Governor of Victoria (1879–1884)
 Western Australia – Major-General Harry Ord, Governor of Western Australia (1877–1880)

Colonial governors
Colonial governors
1879